Carnival Corporation & plc is a British-American cruise operator with a combined fleet of over ninety vessels across nine cruise line brands and one joint venture with China State Shipbuilding Corporation (CSSC). A dual-listed company, Carnival is composed of two companies – Panama-incorporated, US-headquartered Carnival Corporation, and UK-based Carnival plc – which function as one entity. Carnival Corporation is listed on the New York Stock Exchange, whereas Carnival plc is listed on the London Stock Exchange with an ADR listing on the NYSE. Carnival is listed in both the S&P 500 and FTSE 250 indices.

The American entity Carnival Corporation has headquarters in the United States, with operational headquarters located in the city of Doral, Florida. The UK entity Carnival plc is based in Southampton.

History
Carnival Corporation was founded as Carnival Cruise Line in 1972. The company grew steadily throughout the 1970s and 1980s, making an initial public offering on the New York Stock Exchange in 1987. The capital generated was used to finance acquisitions. Between 1989 and 1999, the company acquired Holland America Line, Windstar Cruises, Westours, Seabourn Cruise Line, Costa Cruises and Cunard Line. The name Carnival Corporation was adopted in 1993, to distinguish the parent company from its flagship cruise line subsidiary.

P&O Princess Cruises plc was formed in 2000, following the demerger of the cruise ship division of the P&O group. Originating as the Peninsular and Oriental Steam Navigation Company in England in 1837, P&O operated the world's first commercial cruise ships. Restructuring of the P&O group in the 20th century led to its cruise operations being rebranded as P&O Cruises and P&O Cruises Australia, with the company acquiring Princess Cruises in 1974. Following the demerger in 2000, the company also acquired AIDA Cruises, as well as establishing the A'Rosa Cruises and Ocean Village brands.

In 2003, Carnival Corporation acquired P&O Princess Cruises plc. It was agreed that P&O Princess Cruises plc would remain a separate company, listed on the London Stock Exchange and retaining its British shareholder body and management team. The company was renamed Carnival plc, with the operations of the two companies merged into one entity. Carnival Corporation and Carnival plc jointly own all the operating companies in the Carnival group. Prior to Carnival Corporation's acquisition, P&O Princess Cruises plc had agreed to a merger with Royal Caribbean Cruises Ltd. The deal unraveled as Carnival Corporation initiated a hostile takeover with improved terms for British shareholders.

Carnival sold Windstar Cruises to Ambassadors Group in February 2007 and Swan Hellenic to Lord Sterling in March 2007.

In October 2015, CSSC Carnival Cruise Shipping, a joint venture between Carnival, the China Investment Corporation, and the China State Shipbuilding Corporation, was founded, with operations expected to commence in 2019.

In March 2018, Carnival Corporation announced its intention to invest in the construction of a new terminal in the port of Sasebo, Japan. It is expected to open in 2020.

In June 2018, Carnival Corporation announced that it had acquired the White Pass and Yukon Route from TWC Enterprises Limited for US$290 million. The properties acquired were port, railroad and retail operations in Skagway, Alaska.

Effects of the COVID-19 pandemic 
All cruise ship itineraries were cancelled in March 2020 due to the worldwide pandemic and eventually, 55 passengers on ships owned by Carnival Corporation & plc were reported as having died. After months of cancelled cruises, Carnival Corporation & plc announced in September 2020 that it intended to dispose of 18 ships, a full 12% of the global fleet. By that time, five ships had already been scrapped: Carnival Fantasy, Carnival Fascination, Carnival Imagination, Carnival Inspiration and Costa Victoria.

The corporation also announced that it was delaying the delivery of several ships already on order. These steps were part of the company's cost-cutting plan, important because the "pause in guest operations continues to have a material negative impact on all aspects of the company’s business, including the company’s liquidity, financial position and results of operations". The adjusted net loss in the third quarter was reported by the corporation to the U.S. Securities and Exchange Commission as US$1.7 billion.
  
As of September 2020, the no-sail rule by the Centers for Disease Control and Prevention prohibited cruising in the U.S. until October 31, 2020, at the earliest. Members of the Cruise Lines International Association, including Carnival Corporation & plc, had announced in early August that its members were extending a voluntary suspension until October 31; that applied to cruises that were to depart from the U.S. or planned to stop at U.S. ports of call.

In November 2020, the CEO said he was confident that "universal testing, which doesn't exist in any other industry of scale" would help start the cruising industry.

The company's fourth quarter (ending 30 November 2020) financial statement released on 11 January 2021, indicated that one extra ship, in addition to the 18 previously planned, was to be sold. Carnival Corporation was in an excellent cash position, with US$9.5 billion, but suffered an adjusted net loss of $1.9 billion in the quarter.

Current operations
The Carnival group comprises nine cruise line brands and one cruise experience brand operating a combined fleet of 91 ships.

The following operating companies have full executive control of the Carnival brands in their portfolio, with the exception of CSSC Carnival Cruise Shipping in which 40% is controlled:

Carnival of the Americas
 Carnival Cruise Line – headquarters in Miami, Florida, US 
 White Pass and Yukon Route

Carnival United Kingdom
 P&O Cruises – headquarters in Southampton, UK
 Cunard Line – headquarters in Southampton, UK

Holland America Group
 Holland America Line – headquarters in Seattle, Washington, US
 Princess Cruises – headquarters in Santa Clarita, California, US
 Princess Tours
 Seabourn Cruise Line – headquarters in Seattle, Washington, US

Carnival Australia
 Carnival Cruise Line Australia – headquarters in Sydney, Australia
 P&O Cruises Australia – headquarters in Sydney, Australia

Carnival China
CSSC Carnival Cruise Shipping – headquarters in Hong Kong, China

Costa Group
 Costa Cruises – headquarters in Genoa, Italy
 AIDA Cruises – headquarters in Rostock, Germany

Brands and ships

AIDA Cruises

AIDA Cruises originated from the state-owned German shipping conglomerate Deutsche Seereederei, established in Rostock, Germany, in 1952. The company entered the passenger market in the 1960s, but after the unification of Germany in 1990, the company was privatised and its passenger ships acquired by Deutsche Seetouristik. In 1996, the company launched its first new cruise ship AIDA, but after failing to achieve a profit, the ship was sold to Norwegian Cruise Line, continuing operations under a charter agreement.

In 1999, Deutsche Seetouristik was acquired by British shipping company P&O, with the AIDA name being repurchased from NCL. P&O formed AIDA Cruises as a subsidiary brand, with two new ships ordered to form a fleet. AIDA was renamed AIDAcara, with AIDAvita and AIDAaura launched in 2002 and 2003 respectively.

AIDAaura (until September 2023)
AIDAdiva
AIDAbella
AIDAluna
AIDAblu
AIDAsol
AIDAmar
AIDAstella
AIDAprima
AIDAperla
AIDAnova
AIDAcosma

Carnival Cruise Line

Carnival Cruise Line was founded in 1972 as a subsidiary of American International Travel Service (AITS), by Ted Arison and Meshulam Riklis. Due to mounting debts, Riklis sold his stake in the company to Arison for $1 in 1974. Through the acquisition of existing ships the company continued to grow. In 1980, Carnival ordered its first new commission, the Tropicale, which was completed in 1981/2. Three further ships were commissioned during the 1980s, the Holiday (1985), Jubilee (1986) and Celebration (1987).

In 1987, Carnival completed an initial public offering of 20 percent of its common stock on the New York Stock Exchange, raising approximately $400m in capital. The capital raised was used to finance acquisitions, so in 1993 the business was restructured as a holding company, under the name Carnival Corporation, with Carnival Cruise Line becoming its principal subsidiary.

Carnival Breeze
Carnival Conquest
Carnival Celebration
Carnival Dream
Carnival Elation
Carnival Freedom
Carnival Glory
Carnival Horizon
Carnival Jubilee (due 2023)
Carnival Legend
Carnival Liberty
Carnival Luminosa
Carnival Magic
Mardi Gras
Carnival Miracle
Carnival Panorama
Carnival Paradise
Carnival Pride
Carnival Radiance
Carnival Spirit
Carnival Splendor
Carnival Sunshine
Carnival Sunrise
Carnival Valor 
Carnival Venezia (due May 2023)
Carnival Vista

Costa Cruises

Costa Cruises originates from a cargo shipping company founded by Giacomo Costa fu Andrea in Genoa, Italy in 1854. Better known as Costa Line or C Line by the 1920s, its first passenger carrier was Maria C, a former U.S. Navy stores ship that was partly converted for passenger use and served various routes to North and South America from 1947 to 1953. The company's first dedicated passenger ship was the Anna C, a cargo vessel that was requisitioned for war time use by the Royal Navy and refitted as an accommodation ship before returning to merchant use.

Costa purchased the ship in 1947 and it operated between Italy and South America from 1948, later converting to full-time cruising and serving with the company until 1971. From the late 1960s until the 1980s, Costa rapidly developed its passenger operations into what we now recognise as modern cruise ships. In 1987, it consolidated its cruise ship operations into a new company, Costa Cruises, which at its peak, was the largest cruise ship operator in the world.

The takeover of Costa Cruises by Carnival Corporation began in 1997, as a 50/50 deal between Carnival and the British tour operator Airtours.  On 13 January 2012, Costa Concordia, a ship operated by the line, hit an underwater rock and ran aground in  Isola del Giglio, Tuscany, resulting in 32 deaths. Investigations proved that the captain and general bad organization was responsible for the disaster, and the company was fined.

Costa Deliziosa
Costa Diadema
Costa Fascinosa
Costa Favolosa
Costa Fortuna
Costa Firenze (joins Carnival, 2024)
Costa Pacifica
Costa Serena
Costa Smeralda
Costa Toscana

Carnival CSSC

Adora Cruises (CSSC Carnival Cruise Shipping) is a Chinese-American cruise line that is scheduled to begin operation in 2023. CSSC Carnival was founded in October 2015 as a joint venture, worth about $4 billion over ten years, between American cruise line Carnival Corporation & plc, Chinese sovereign wealth fund China Investment Corporation, and Chinese shipbuilder China State Shipbuilding Corporation (CSSC). CSSC Carnival is headquartered in Hong Kong. It is majority owned by the Chinese shareholders, which collectively own 60% of the company, with Carnival holding the remainder.

 Costa Atlantica
 Costa Mediterranea
 Vista-class newbuilding (due 2023)
 Vista-class newbuilding (due 2024)

Cunard Line

The second oldest brand in the Carnival group after P&O, Cunard Line originated in 1840 and celebrated its 180th anniversary in 2020. It was founded by Samuel Cunard, who was awarded the first trans-Atlantic mail contract in 1837 and established the British and North American Royal Mail Steam-Packet Company in 1840. After initially dominating the trans-Atlantic route, the need for new capital led to the company being re-organised as the Cunard Steamship Company Ltd in 1879. The early 1900s saw increased competition for speed, particularly from Germany, which led the British government to subsidise the building of Mauretania and Lusitania, which both won the Blue Riband. Competition continued to increase however and by the early 1930s, Cunard was experiencing financial difficulties. To secure further government subsidy, it agreed to merge with its chief rival White Star Line, to form Cunard-White Star Line in 1934. Cunard later purchased the remaining White Star shares in 1947, reverting to the name Cunard Line in 1949. Cunard continued to operate independently until 1971, when it was acquired by the conglomerate Trafalgar House, which was in turn taken over by the Norwegian company Kværner in 1996. In 1998, Carnival Corporation purchased a controlling stake in Cunard, completing the acquisition in 1999 to become sole shareholder.  Since that time, Cunard has been one of Carnival's most high-profile brands, with the continued popularity of the famous Queen Elizabeth 2 and the development of the world's largest trans-Atlantic Ocean liner Queen Mary 2, which continues to be the flagship of the fleet.

Queen Mary 2
Queen Victoria
Queen Elizabeth
Queen Anne (due 2024)

Holland America Line

Holland America Line originated as Plate, Reuchlin & Company, founded in Rotterdam, Netherlands, in 1871. Initially struggling to survive, the company went public in 1873, renamed Nederlandsch Amerikaansche Stoomvaart Maatschappij (NASM). The company grew quickly in the early years, acquiring several new ships, including SS Rotterdam, which operated the company's first passenger cruise in 1895. The company also quickly became known by its shortened English name, Holland America Line. By the early 1900s, the company had separated its cargo and passenger operations, with its passenger ships being identifiable by names ending with dam, a tradition which continues with Holland America cruise ships today. The development of container shipping in the 1960s, forced the company to make a decision between investing in new cargo ships, or cruise ships. It ultimately sold its cargo operations, becoming exclusively a cruise ship company in 1973. Holland America continued to thrive well into the 1980s, consolidating its business with the acquisitions of Westours, Windstar Cruises and Home Lines. In 1989 however, it was itself the subject of an acquisition, when it was purchased in full by Carnival Corporation.

Eurodam
Koningsdam
Nieuw Amsterdam
Noordam
Oosterdam
Nieuw Statendam
Rotterdam
Volendam
Westerdam
Zaandam
Zuiderdam

P&O Cruises

P&O Cruises was originally a subsidiary of the British shipping company P&O and was founded in 1977. Along with P&O Cruises Australia, it has the oldest heritage of any cruise line in the world, dating to P&O's first passenger operations in 1837. P&O Cruises was divested from P&O in 2000, subsequently becoming a subsidiary of P&O Princess Cruises, before coming under the ownership of Carnival Corporation & plc in 2003, following the merger between P&O Princess Cruises and Carnival Corporation. P&O Cruises is based in Southampton, England, and operates a fleet of seven ships, dedicated to serving the British market.

Arcadia
Arvia
Aurora
Azura
Britannia
Iona
Ventura

P&O Cruises Australia

Pacific Adventure
Pacific Encounter
Pacific Explorer

Princess Cruises

Caribbean Princess
Coral Princess
Crown Princess
Diamond Princess
Discovery Princess 
Emerald Princess
Enchanted Princess 
Grand Princess
Island Princess
Majestic Princess
Regal Princess
Royal Princess
Ruby Princess
Sapphire Princess
Sky Princess
Sun Princess (due 2024)
TBA (due 2025)

Seabourn Cruise Line

Seabourn Encore
Seabourn Odyssey (until August 2024)
Seabourn Ovation
Seabourn Pursuit (due 2023)
Seabourn Quest
Seabourn Sojourn
Seabourn Venture

Former brands
A'Rosa Cruises – Established by P&O Princess in 2001, sold following the Carnival merger in 2003
Fathom – Established by the Carnival Corporation in 2015 – Ended cruise operations in 2017. Its functions were reduced to operating as a tour group until the end of 2018. 
Fiesta Marina Cruises – Established by Carnival Corp in 1993, liquidated in 1994. The sole ship was sold to the Epirotiki Line.
Ibero Cruises – Established by Carnival Corp in 2003, liquidated in 2014 with ships transferred to Costa Cruises and Cruise & Maritime Voyages.
Ocean Village – Established by P&O Princess in 2003, liquidated in 2010 with ship transferred to P&O Cruises Australia
Swan Hellenic – P&O Princess subsidiary since 1983, liquidated in 2007 with ship transferred to Princess Cruises
Windstar Cruises – Carnival subsidiary since 1989, sold to Ambassadors International in 2007.

Violations of environmental laws
In 2002 the Carnival Corporation pleaded guilty in United States District Court in Miami to criminal charges related to falsifying records of the oil-contaminated bilge water that six of its ships dumped into the sea from 1996 through 2001. The Carnival Corporation was ordered to pay $18 million in fines and perform community service, received five years' probation and must submit to a court-supervised worldwide environmental-compliance program for each of its cruise ships.

For dumping oiled waste into the seas and lying to cover it up, Princess Cruise Lines was fined $40 million in 2016. According to federal authorities, it was the "largest-ever criminal penalty" for intentional vessel pollution. Officials said that these practices began in 2005 and persisted until August 2013, when a newly hired engineer blew the whistle. As part of its plea agreement, ships of the parent company Carnival Cruise lines were subjected to a court supervised environmental compliance plan for five years.

For violation of the probation terms of 2016 Carnival and its Princess line were ordered to pay an additional $20 million penalty in 2019. The new violations included discharging plastic into waters in the Bahamas, falsifying records, and interfering with court supervision.

Notable former ships

Carnival has had various notable ships in the past including:
Pacific Princess (Princess Cruises) – Became famous for appearing in the romantic comedy anthology TV series The Love Boat and was featured in nearly every episode. She sailed for Princess Cruises from 1975 to 2002.
Queen Elizabeth 2 (Cunard Line) – The flagship of Cunard Line when acquired by Carnival Corporation. She was sold to Istithmar World in 2008.
Rotterdam (Holland America Line) – The flagship of Holland America Line for 40 years. She was sold to Premier Cruises in 1997 and renamed Rembrandt. She currently operates under her original name as a floating hotel and museum in Rotterdam, Netherlands.
Costa Concordia (Costa Cruises) – Struck a rock and sank off the coast of Isola del Giglio, Italy in 2012, in the Costa Concordia disaster. 32 passengers and crew members were killed, along with 1 salvage operator, while 64 other people were injured.
Adonia (Fathom and P&O Cruises) – First cruise ship to sail to Cuba from the United States mainland since the United States embargo against Cuba over 40 years ago. She was sold to Azamara Club Cruises in 2018 and renamed Azamara Pursuit.
Oriana (P&O Cruises) – The first cruise ship commissioned for the UK market. She was sold to Astro Ocean in 2019 and renamed Piano Land.

References

External links
 Carnival Corporation website

 
1993 establishments in England
1993 establishments in Florida
American companies established in 1993
British companies established in 1993
Companies based in Doral, Florida
Companies based in Miami-Dade County, Florida
Companies based in Southampton
Hospitality companies established in 1993
Companies listed on the London Stock Exchange
Companies listed on the New York Stock Exchange
Offshore companies of Panama
Cruise lines
Dual-listed companies
Shipping companies of the United Kingdom
Travel and holiday companies of the United Kingdom